Gary Mills O'Reilly (born 21 March 1961) is an English former professional footballer who played in the Football League for Tottenham Hotspur, Brighton & Hove Albion, Crystal Palace and Birmingham City as a central defender.

Life and career
O'Reilly was born in Isleworth, now part of Greater London. He played for Grays Athletic before turning professional with Tottenham Hotspur in 1979, and made his debut the following year. After 45 League games for the club, he joined Brighton & Hove Albion for a £45,000 fee. He stayed with Brighton for two-and-a-half seasons before moving on to Crystal Palace. He scored in the 1989–90 FA Cup semi-final as Palace beat Liverpool 4–3 after extra time, and then scored the opening goal in the final, against Manchester United. The match ended in a 3–3 draw, and Palace lost replay 1–0 five days later.

After a brief spell on loan at Birmingham City, O'Reilly rejoined Brighton & Hove Albion in January 1991. Brighton finished that season sixth in the Second Division and reached the playoff final, where they were beaten by Notts County. Any hopes of another promotion challenge the following season – and of a place in the new FA Premier League – were quickly forgotten as Brighton found themselves fighting a battle against relegation which was eventually lost. O'Reilly then retired from playing.

Following his retirement from football, he made a career in sports broadcasting. He has appeared on BBC Five Live's  Fighting Talk, as a pundit on pan-African broadcaster GTV's Saturday morning preview show and Sunday night review show, as a commentator for Trans World International and Sky Sports, and as both pundit and commentator on UEFA Champions League matches for ART Prime Sports, Dubai. From February 2017, O'Reilly and Chuck Nice co-hosted the podcast Playing with Science.

Honours
Tottenham Hotspur
UEFA Cup: 1983–84

References

1961 births
Living people
Footballers from Isleworth
English footballers
Association football central defenders
Grays Athletic F.C. players
Tottenham Hotspur F.C. players
Brighton & Hove Albion F.C. players
Crystal Palace F.C. players
Birmingham City F.C. players
UEFA Cup winning players
English Football League players
FA Cup Final players